Wolf Creek is an unincorporated community in Lewis and Clark County, Montana, United States, along Interstate 15,  north of Helena. Its ZIP code is 59648.

In 1887, the Montana Central Railway built its line through the narrow Prickly Pear Canyon, and the town of Wolf Creek, named for the creek, grew to serve the railroad. It later served workers building the Holter Dam from 1908–1910. Interstate 15 split the town in half, nearly obliterating it.

Demographics

Education 
Wolf Creek School District #13 has one elementary school providing education for grades K-5.

6-12 students home district is Helena Schools to the south in Lewis and Clark County

In popular culture 
In the movie A River Runs Through It, Wolf Creek is the home of Jessie Burns, the love interest of main character Norman Maclean. It was also a filming locale for parts of the movie Thunderbolt and Lightfoot.
In Australia, the Seven Network's reality television series The World's Strictest Parents featured a family from Wolf Creek, Montana.
In the 1970s, Marlboro selected Wolf Creek resident Herf Ingersoll as their "Marlboro Man."

Climate
According to the Köppen Climate Classification system, Wolf Creek has a semi-arid climate, abbreviated "BSk" on climate maps.

References

Unincorporated communities in Lewis and Clark County, Montana
Unincorporated communities in Montana